The Surface Transportation Board (STB) of the United States is a federal, bipartisan, independent adjudicatory board. The STB was established on January 1, 1996, to assume some of the regulatory functions that had been administered by the Interstate Commerce Commission when the ICC was abolished. Other ICC regulatory functions were either eliminated or transferred to the Federal Motor Carrier Safety Administration or Bureau of Transportation Statistics within DOT.

The STB has broad economic regulatory oversight of railroads, including rates, service, the construction, acquisition, and abandonment of rail lines, carrier mergers, and interchange of traffic among carriers. The STB also has oversight of pipeline carriers, intercity bus carriers, moving van companies, trucking companies involved in collective activities, and water carriers engaged in non-contiguous domestic trade. The Board has wide discretion, through its exemption authority from federal, state, and local laws, to tailor its regulatory activities to meet the nation's changing transportation needs.

Performance and policy goals

The Board provides a forum for the resolution of surface-transportation disputes and other matters within its jurisdiction. It has the authority to limit or remove regulatory requirements where appropriate.

Organizational structure and members

The Board is composed of five members nominated by the President and confirmed by the Senate for five-year terms. The Surface Transportation Board Reauthorization Act expanded the Board from three to five members in 2015.

The Board's chairman is designated by the President from among the members. As its chief executive, the chairman coordinates and organizes the agency's work and acts as its representative in legislative matters and in relations with other governmental bodies. Chairman Martin J. Oberman was nominated to the Surface Transportation Board by President Donald Trump on July 17, 2018, was confirmed by the U.S. Senate on January 2, 2019, and was sworn in on January 21, 2019. He was designated as the Board's chairman on January 21, 2021 by President Joe Biden, succeeding Ann Begeman who had been Chairman and Acting Chairman between January 2017 and January 2021.

The vice chairman represents the Board and assumes the chairman's duties as appropriate. Additionally, the vice chairman oversees matters involving the admission, discipline, and disbarment of non-attorney Board practitioners. The current vice chairman is Robert E. Primus, appointed February 1, 2021, succeeding Martin J. Oberman in the board's annual rotation of that position.

Martin J. Oberman was confirmed to the Board on January 3, 2019, by a voice vote in the United States Senate. He was designated chairman of the board by President Joe Biden on January 21, 2021.

Karen J. Hedlund was confirmed on December 16, 2021, as a member of the Board. 

Patrick Fuchs was confirmed to the Board on January 2, 2019, by a voice vote in the United States Senate.

Michelle Schultz and Robert E. Primus were confirmed to two newly-created seats on the board on November 18, 2020, both by voice vote. Schultz's term runs for five years from the day of entering office. Primus' term runs until December 31, 2027. Hedlund was named as vice chair on January 9, 2023.

Assisting the Board in carrying out its responsibilities is a staff of 117 (FY2018) with experience in economics, law, accounting, transportation analysis, finance and administration.

Past members 
Linda J. Morgan April 28, 1994 – December 31, 2003
Gus A. Owen 1995 – 1998
J.J. Simmons III January 1, 1996 – end of 1996
William Clyburn, Jr. 1998 – 2001
Wayne Burkes February 22, 1999 – December 31, 2002
Roger Nober 2002 – January 4, 2006
Francis P. Mulvey 2004 – January 3, 2013
W. Douglas Buttrey May 28, 2004 – March 13, 2009
Charles D. Nottingham August 2006 – 2011
Daniel R. Elliott III 2009 – 2017
Deb Miller April 28, 2014 – January 1, 2019
Ann D. Begeman May 2, 2011 – December 17, 2021

Offices

Office of Public Assistance, Governmental Affairs, and Compliance

The Office of Public Assistance, Governmental Affairs, and Compliance serves as the agency's principal point of contact with Congress, state and local governments, the media, industry stakeholders and the general public.  This office includes the Rail Customer and Public Assistance Program, where Board staff solves problems in ways ranging from a simple answer to a telephone inquiry to lengthy informal dispute resolution efforts between railroads and shippers.

Office of Economics

The Office of Economics analyzes rate cases, conducts economic and financial analyses of the railroad industry, and audits Class I railroads.

Office of Economics, Environmental Analysis and Administration

The Office of Economics, Environmental Analysis and Administration is responsible for undertaking environmental reviews of proposed STB actions in accordance with the National Environmental Policy Act and other environmental laws and making environmental recommendations to the STB.

Office of the Managing Director

The Office of the Managing Director handles administrative matters such as personnel, budget and information technology.

Office of Proceedings

The Office of Proceedings (OP) is the office with primary responsibility for developing the public record in formal cases (or proceedings) filed with the STB, making recommendations regarding the resolution of issues presented in those cases, and preparing the decisions issued by the Board.

The Office of Proceedings is a legal office, consisting almost entirely of attorneys and paralegal specialists, responsible for the majority of the cases at the STB. The office applies the Interstate Commerce Act, as amended by the ICC Termination Act of 1995, as well as the Board's own regulations. In carrying out its responsibilities, the Office of Proceedings obtains and applies any necessary input from economic, financial, operational, environmental, and other legal staff experts throughout the agency.

The Office of Proceedings includes a clearance unit responsible for tabulating votes on STB cases and recording the official outcome of those votes, and a recordations unit that enters data about a filing's primary and secondary documents into the STB Recordations database, which is accessible to the public on the STB web site.

Office of General Counsel

The Office of the General Counsel (OGC) responds to questions on a variety of legal issues. However, its primary mission is two-fold: to defend the STB's decisions in court and to assess the defensibility of agency decisions that might be challenged in court. Unlike most Federal agencies, the STB has independent litigating authority. Under the Hobbs Act, when an STB order or decision is challenged in the U.S. Court of Appeals, both the STB (represented by the agency's own attorneys) and the United States (represented by U.S. Department of Justice (DOJ) attorneys) must be named as "respondents" (defendants), and both have authority to appear in court in such cases. STB and DOJ attorneys, in most cases, jointly defend the agency's decisions, with the STB's attorneys preparing written briefs (in consultation with DOJ attorneys) and presenting oral arguments on behalf of the Federal Government.

In performing defensibility assessments, OGC attorneys meet with other STB staff to discuss cases before draft decisions are prepared. Defensibility assessments are key to issuing sound decisions that are less likely to be challenged and, if challenged, are more likely to be upheld.

References

External links
Surface Transportation Board
Records of the Interstate Commerce Commission and Surface Transportation Board in the National Archives (Record Group 134)
Surface Transportation Board in the Federal Register
Text of Interstate Commerce Commission Termination Act of 1995

1995 establishments in the United States
Interstate Commerce Commission 
United States railroad regulation
Independent agencies of the United States government
Rail transportation in the United States